British Birds could refer to

 British Birds (magazine)
 The British avifauna

Lists
 List of birds of Great Britain